Improvisation is the activity of making or doing something not planned beforehand, using whatever can be found. Improvisation in the performing arts is a very spontaneous performance without specific or scripted preparation. The skills of improvisation can apply to many different faculties, across all artistic, scientific, physical, cognitive, academic, and non-academic disciplines; see Applied improvisation.

Improvisation also exists outside the arts. Improvisation in engineering is to solve a problem with the tools and materials immediately at hand. Improvised weapons are often used by guerrillas, insurgents and criminals.

Engineering

Improvisation in engineering is to solve a problem with the tools and materials immediately at hand. Examples of such improvisation was the re-engineering of carbon dioxide scrubbers with the materials on hand during the Apollo 13 space mission, or the use of a knife in place of a screwdriver to turn a screw.

Engineering improvisations may be needed because of emergencies, embargo, obsolescence of a product and the loss of manufacturer support, or just a lack of funding appropriate for a better solution. Users of motor vehicles in parts of Africa develop improvised solutions where it is not feasible to obtain manufacturer-approved spare parts.

The popular television program MacGyver used as its gimmick a hero who could solve almost any problem with jury rigged devices from everyday materials, a Swiss Army knife and some duct tape.

Performing arts

Improvisation can be thought of as an "on the spot" or "off the cuff" spontaneous moment of sudden inventiveness that can just come to mind, body and spirit as an inspiration. Viola Spolin created theater games as a method of training improvisational acting. Her son, Paul Sills popularized improvisational theater, or IMPROV, by using Spolin's techniques to train The Second City in Chicago, the first totally improvisational theater company in the US. However,  Improvisation in any life or art form can occur more often if it is practiced as a way of encouraging creative behavior. That practice includes learning to use one's intuition, as well as learning a technical understanding of the necessary skills and concerns within the domain in which one is improvising. This can be when an individual or group is acting, dancing, singing, playing musical instruments, talking, creating artworks, problem-solving, or reacting in the moment and in response to the stimulus of one's immediate environment and inner feelings. This can result in the invention of new thought patterns, new practices, new structures or symbols, and/or new ways to act.

Improvisation was originally rarely used on dramatic television. A major exception was the situation comedy Mork & Mindy where star Robin Williams was allotted specific sections in each episode where he was allowed to perform freely.

Music

Musical improvisation is usually defined as the spontaneous performance of music without previous preparation or any written notes. In other words, the art of improvisation can be understood as composing music "on the fly". There have been experiments by Charles Limb, using functional magnetic resonance imaging, that show the brain activity during musical improvisation. Limb showed increased activity in the medial prefrontal cortex, which is an area associated with an increase in self-expression. Further, there was decreased activity in the lateral prefrontal cortex, which is an area associated with self-monitoring. This change in activity is thought to reduce the inhibitions that normally prevent individuals from taking risks and improvising.

Improvisation can take place as a solo performance, or interdependently in an ensemble with other players. When done well, it often elicits gratifying emotional responses from the audience. One notable improvisational pianist is Franz Liszt. The origins of Liszt's improvisation in an earlier tradition of playing variations on a theme were mastered and epitomized by Johann Sebastian Bach, Wolfgang Amadeus Mozart, and Ludwig van Beethoven.

Notable improvisational musicians from the modern era include Keith Jarrett, an improvisational jazz pianist and multi-instrumentalist who has performed many improvised concerts all over the world; W. A. Mathieu a.k.a. William Allaudin Mathieu, the musical director for The Second City in Chicago, the first ongoing improvisational theatre troupe in the United States, and later musical director for another improv theatre, The Committee, an offshoot of The Second City in San Francisco; Derek Bailey, an improvisational guitarist; and Eugene Friesen, an improvisational cellist.

Improvised freestyle rap is commonly practiced as a part of rappers' creative processes, as a "finished product" for release on recordings (when the improvisation is judged good enough), as a spiritual event, as a means of verbal combat in battle rap, and, simply, for fun. As mentioned above, studies have suggested that improvisation allows a musician to relax the control filters in their mind during this exercise. It often incorporates insults similar to those in the African-American game The Dozens, and complex rhythmic and sometimes melodic forms comparable to those heard in jazz improvisation.

In the realm of silent film music, there are a small number of musicians whose work has been recognized as exceptional by critics, scholars and audiences alike; these include Neil Brand and John Sweeney, among others who are all performers at the Pordenone Silent Film Festival in Italy. Their performances must match the style and pacing of those films which they accompany and the knowledge of a wide range of musical styles is required, as well as the stamina to play for films which occasionally run more than three hours, without a pause.

Theatre

Improvisation, in theatre, is the playing of dramatic scenes without written dialogue and with minimal or no predetermined dramatic activity. The method has been used for different purposes in theatrical history.

Comedy
Improvisational comedy is a theatre art performed throughout the world and has had an on-again, off-again status throughout history.

Some of the more famous improv theatres and training centers in the world include: i.O. (formerly ImprovOlympic) in Chicago and Los Angeles, The Second City in Chicago and Toronto, The Players Workshop in Chicago, National Comedy Theatre in San Diego, New York and Phoenix, Upright Citizens Brigade, the Peoples Improv Theater, the Magnet Theater in New York, The Groundlings in Los Angeles, BATS Improv (Bay Area Theatre Sports) in San Francisco, Wing-It Productions in Seattle, Philly Improv Theater in Philadelphia, Brave New Workshop in Minneapolis, ComedySportz in Milwaukee, Theatresports in Calgary and Improv Comedy Copenhagen.

There are also many well known university improv teams, including Theatre Strike Force at the University of Florida, Gigglepants at the University of Texas at Austin, and Erasable Inc. at the University of Maryland. Improvisation found a home at universities. The origins of the Second City was the Compass Players, an offshoot of theatre programs at the University of Chicago in the 1950s. Later, once improv had been established as an art form, improv groups sprung up on college campuses, starting in the 1980s where crowds were easy to find and teams could perform frequently. Now an improv group is a common staple of college extra curricular activities.

Notable pioneers in the field of improvisation, comedic or otherwise, include Mike Myers, Neil Mullarkey, Paul Merton, Stephen Fry, John Sessions, Josie Lawrence, Viola Spolin, Paul Sills, David Shepherd, Del Close, Josephine Forsberg, Gary Austin, Martin de Maat, and Keith Johnstone. Notable performers include: Paul Merton, Stephen Colbert, Steve Carell, Bill Murray, Harold Ramis, Robert Townsend, Colin Mochrie, Ryan Stiles, Ross Noble, Eddie Izzard, Tony Slattery, Mike McShane, Sandi Toksvig, Wayne Brady, Jonathan Winters, T. J. Jagodowski, Robin Williams, Conan O'Brien and David Pasquesi.

Dance
Dance improvisation as a choreographic tool: Improvisation is used as a choreographic tool in dance composition. Experimenting with the concepts of shape, space, time, and energy while moving without inhibition or cognitive thinking can create unique and innovative movement designs, spatial configuration, dynamics, and unpredictable rhythms. Improvisation without inhibition allows the choreographer to connect to their deepest creative self, which in turn clears the way for pure invention. This cognitive inhibition is similar to the inhibition described by Limb for musical improvisation, which can be found in the music section above.

Contact improvisation: a form developed in 1973, that is now practiced around the world. Contact improvisation originated from the movement studies of Steve Paxton in the 1970s and developed through the continued exploration of the Judson Dance Theater. It is a dance form based on weight sharing, partnering, playing with weight, exploring negative space and unpredictable outcomes.

Skills and techniques
The skills of improvisation can apply to many different abilities or forms of communication and expression across all artistic, scientific, physical, cognitive, academic, and non-academic disciplines. For example, improvisation can make a significant contribution in music, dance, cooking, presenting a speech, sales, personal or romantic relationships, sports, flower arranging, martial arts, psychotherapy, and much more.

Techniques of improvisation are widely used in training for performing arts or entertainment; for example, music, theatre and dance. To "extemporize" or "ad lib" is basically the same as improvising. Colloquial terms such as "let's play it by the ear", "take it as it comes", and "make it up as we go along" are all used to describe "improvisation".

The simple act of speaking requires a good deal of improvisation because the mind is addressing its own thought and creating its unrehearsed delivery in words, sounds and gestures, forming unpredictable statements that further feed the thought process (the performer as the listener), creating an enriched process that is not unlike instantaneous composition [with a given set or repertoire of elements].

Where the improvisation is intended to solve a problem on a temporary basis, the "proper" solution being unavailable at the time, it may be known as a "stop-gap". This applies to the field of engineering. Another improvisational, group problem-solving technique being used in organizations of all kinds is brainstorming, in which any and all ideas that a group member may have are permitted and encouraged to be expressed, regardless of actual practicality. As in all improvisation, the process of brainstorming opens up the minds of the people involved to new, unexpected and possibly useful ideas. The colloquial term for this is "thinking outside the box."

Artificial intelligence

Sculpture
Sculpture often relies on the enlargement of a small model or maquette to create the final work in a chosen material. Where the material is plastic such as clay, a working structure or armature often needs to be built to allow the pre-determined design to be realized. Alan Thornhill's method for working with clay abandons the maquette, seeing it as ultimately deadening to creativity. Without the restrictions of the armature, a clay matrix of elements allows that when recognizable forms start to emerge, they can be essentially disregarded by turning the work, allowing for infinite possibility and the chance for the unforeseen to emerge more powerfully at a later stage.

Moving from adding and taking away to purely reductive working, the architectural considerations of turning the work are eased considerably but continued removal of material through the rejection of forms deemed too obvious can mean one ends up with nothing. Former pupil Jon Edgar uses Thornhill's method as a creative extension to direct carving in stone and wood.

Film 
The director Mike Leigh uses lengthy improvisations developed over a period of weeks to build characters and story lines for his films. He starts with some sketch ideas of how he thinks things might develop but does not reveal all his intentions with the cast who discover their fate and act out their responses as their destinies are gradually revealed, including significant aspects of their lives which will not subsequently be shown onscreen. The final filming draws on dialogue and actions that have been recorded during the improvisation period.

Writing
Improvisational writing is an exercise that imposes limitations on a writer such as a time limit, word limit, a specific topic, or rules on what can be written. This forces the writer to work within stream of consciousness and write without judgment of the work they produce. This technique is used for a variety of reasons, such as to bypass writer's block, improve creativity, strengthen one's writing instinct and enhance one's flexibility in writing.

Some improvisational writing is collaborative, focusing on an almost dadaist form of collaborative fiction. This can take a variety of forms, from as basic as passing a notebook around a circle of writers with each writing a sentence, to coded environments that focus on collaborative novel-writing, like OtherSpace.

Improvised weapons

Improvised weapons are often used by guerrillas, insurgents and criminals as conventional weapons may be unavailable. Such weapons vary in sophistication from simple sharpened sticks, to petrol bombs and homemade napalm, to improvised explosive devices and makeshift bomber aircraft. Weapons are also improvised by regular military organizations and formations as "stop-gap" measures when purpose-built equipment is either not on hand or is simply not yet available.

Notes

References 
 Abbot, John. 2009. Improvisation in Rehearsal. Nick Hern Books. .
 Abbot, John. 2007. The Improvisation Book. Nick Hern Books. .
 Harrigan, Pat. 2002. First Person: New Media as Story, Performance and Game. MIT Press. .
 Johnston, Chris. 2006. The Improvisation Game: Discovering the Secrets of Spontaneous Performance. Nick Hern Books. .
 Madson, Patricia Ryan. 2005. Improv Wisdom: Don't Prepare, Just Show Up. Bell Tower. .

External links 

 
 Critical studies in improvisation
 Easy piano improvisation 

 
Engineering concepts
Cinematic techniques
Music genres
Poetic devices
Sculpture techniques
Theatre